2-Chloronaphthalene is an organochlorine chemical compound, a chlorinated derivative of naphthalene. The compound is an isomer for 1-chloronaphthalene.

Synthesis
2-Chloronaphthalene is obtained directly by chlorination of naphthalene, with the formation of more highly substituted derivatives such as dichloro- and trichloronaphthalenes, in addition to the two monochlorinated isomeric compounds: 1-chloronaphthalene and 2-chloronaphthalene.

Properties
2-Chloronaphthalene is a combustible, off-white odorless solid, which is practically insoluble in water. The compound may react with strong oxidizing agents.

Applications
2-Chloronaphthalene can be used for the production of fullerenes.

See also
1-Fluoronaphthalene
1-Bromonaphthalene

References

Chloroarenes
2-Naphthyl compounds